Thomas Engert is a German professional pool player. Engert won the 2004 International Challenge of Champions beating fellow German Thorsten Hohmann in the finals. When he returned to the tournament one year later, Engert was close to winning it for the second consecutive time but Chao Fong-pang, who was then the two-time winner of the event, defeated him in the finals.

Engert has won the German Pool Championships more than any other player, on 20 occasions.

In 2004, Engert won the World Pool Masters over another fellow German, Oliver Ortmann.

In the 2006 World Straight Pool Championship, Engert made his way into the final but loss to Thorsten Hohmann by a score of 200-80 . In 2007, Engert won the World Pool Masters for the second time. This included him with Francisco Bustamante and Ralf Souquet who won the event more than once.

Titles
 2008 Euro Tour Germany Open
 2007 World Pool Masters 
 2005 Euro Tour Swiss Open
 2004 World Pool Masters 
 2004 International Challenge of Champions 
 2004 Euro Tour Italian Open
 2004 German Pool Championship 14.1
 2004 European Pool Championship 9-Ball
 2003 German Pool Championship 8-Ball
 2002 German Pool Championship 14.1
 2001 European Pool Championship 14.1
 2001 German Pool Championship Team
 1999 German Pool Championship Team
 1998 Euro Tour Poland Open
 1997 German Pool Championship 14.1
 1997 Euro Tour Spain Open
 1997 German Pool Championship Team
 1996 German Pool Championship 9-Ball
 1996 Euro Tour Netherlands Open
 1996 German Pool Championship 8-Ball
 1996 German Pool Championship 14.1
 1994 Euro Tour Germany Open
 1994 German Pool Championship 8-Ball
 1994 European Pool Championship 14.1
 1993 German Pool Championship 8-Ball
 1993 European Pool Championship 14.1
 1992 Euro Tour Hungarian Open
 1992 German Pool Championship 8-Ball
 1992 Euro Tour Dutch Open
 1991 German Pool Championship 8-Ball
 1991 European Pool Championship 9-Ball 
 1990 German Pool Championship 9-Ball
 1990 German Pool Championship 8-Ball
 1990 European Pool Championship 9-Ball
 1990 German Pool Championship 14.1
 1989 German Pool Championship 8-Ball
 1989 European Pool Championship 9-Ball
 1989 German Pool Championship 9-Ball
 1988 German Pool Championship 9-Ball

References

 Industry profile of Thomas Engert

External links
 Official website of Thomas Engert

German pool players
Living people
Year of birth missing (living people)
Place of birth missing (living people)
World Games bronze medalists
Competitors at the 2001 World Games
Competitors at the 2005 World Games